Paulo Pita (born June 3, 1994) is a former Brazilian soccer player and current coach. He formerly played as a goalkeeper at the collegiate level for the Charleston Golden Eagles and the Marshall Thundering Herd.

Career

College & Senior
Pita played college soccer at University of Charleston in 2016 and 2017. In his sophomore season, he posted a 20-1-2 record en route to leading the Golden Eagles to the NCAA Division II men's soccer national championship. In the title game, he posted a shutout and was named Most Outstanding Player.

He transferred to Marshall University, where he played in 2018 and 2019.

Concurrent with his college career, Pita played the 2016 and 2018 seasons with The Villages SC of the Premier Development League, appearing in 20 games, along with a handful of other appearances. During the 2017 season, Pita played for Chattanooga FC in the National Premier Soccer League. Pita started out the season as the team's back-up keeper but eventually won the starting position; making 9 league appearances. In 2019, Pita played for FC Wichita of the National Premier Soccer League.

References

1994 births
Association football goalkeepers
Brazilian expatriate footballers
Brazilian footballers
Charleston Golden Eagles men's soccer players
FC Wichita players
Living people
Marshall Thundering Herd men's soccer players
Sportspeople from Santos, São Paulo
The Villages SC players
USL Championship players
USL League Two players
Los Angeles FC draft picks
Soccer players from Oklahoma
Sporting Kansas City non-playing staff
Brazilian expatriate sportspeople in the United States
Expatriate soccer players in the United States